The Tooting by-election was a by-election in the constituency of Tooting on 16 June 2016, triggered by the resignation of Sadiq Khan from Parliament following his election as Mayor of London.

Candidates
Rosena Allin-Khan, an accident and emergency doctor and deputy leader of the Labour group on Wandsworth Council, was the Labour candidate.

Dan Watkins was the Conservative Party's candidate. He was the 2015 candidate and is currently the party's spokesman for Tooting and a local campaigner for issues including for a local station on the planned Crossrail 2 railway.

Esther Obiri-Darko was the Green Party's  candidate. She also stood at the 2015 election.

Alex Glassbrook, a local barrister and volunteer lawyer, was the candidate for the Liberal Democrats.

Elizabeth Jones, who had recently stood in the London Assembly election, stood for the UK Independence Party (UKIP).

Des Coke stood for the Christian Peoples Alliance.

Howling Laud Hope was the candidate of the Monster Raving Loony Party.

There were three independent candidates: Zirwa Javaid, Zia Samadani and Smiley Smillie. Ankit Love, who was a candidate in the London mayoral election, stood for One Love Party. Akbar Ali Malik stood under the banner of the Immigrants Political Party. Graham Moore stood for the English Democrats. Bobby Smith, leader of Give Me Back Elmo and perennial election candidate, stood for his party.

Former MP George Galloway had floated the idea of standing after his candidacy in the London mayoral election, but withdrew, citing fears of splitting the Labour vote and thus allowing the Conservatives to win.

Result
A two minute silence was held during the count, to commemorate Jo Cox, the MP for Batley and Spen, who was killed on the day of the election.

Previous result

References

See also
 List of United Kingdom by-elections (2010–present)

Tooting by-election
Tooting by-election
Tooting,2016
Tooting by-election